Shauraseni Prakrit was a Middle Indo-Aryan language and a Dramatic Prakrit. Shauraseni was the chief language used in drama in medieval northern India. Most of the material in this language originates from the 3rd to 10th centuries, though it was probably a spoken vernacular around the 2nd century BCE in the ancient state of Surasena. Among the Prakrits, Shauraseni is said to be the one most closely related to Classical Sanskrit in that it "is derived from the Old Indian Indo-Aryan dialect of the Madhyadeśa on which Classical Sanskrit was mainly based." Its descendants include the languages of the Hindi Belt, the Central Zone of modern Indo-Aryan or Hindi languages, the standard registers of the Hindustani language based on the Delhi dialect.

See also
Saurashtra language
Apabhraṃśa
Prakrit

References

Languages attested from the 3rd century
Languages extinct in the 10th century
Indo-Aryan languages
Medieval languages
Prakrit languages
North India